Mindaugas Vaitkūnas (born May 27, 1997) is a Lithuanian mixed martial artist who competes in the welterweight category.

Mixed martial arts career 
Vaitkunas was born in Vilnius, Lithuania to Jonas Vaitkūnas and Dr. Živilė Glaveckaitė, and is the grandson of Lithuanian politician Kęstutis Glaveckas. He was educated at St. John's Northwestern Military Academy in Delafield, Wisconsin, USA and was a JROTC cadet there from June 2012 to May 2016.

At St. John's, Vaitkunas earned a Silver Star and was elected for the Raider Challenge Team and nominated as Ultimate Raider. He was on the varsity wrestling team for the St. John's military academy, representing the 170 pound (77 kg) weight class. Vaitkunas was selected for military cadre training for a Platoon Sargeant position. His academy officials also invited him for U.S Special Forces training but he declined to pursue his athletic ambitions.

He graduated from Los Angeles Pierce College with a degree in Business, and took business and leadership courses at Harvard Business School as well as San Diego University. Vaitkunas competed in the 2016 European Grappling Championship in the 84 kg weight class and defeated Augustas Stravinskas in the finals for first place. He also competed in the absolute category, defeating Alex Valiukevič in the finals for first place.

Vaitkunas made his professional martial arts debut at the age of 21. In 2018, Vaitkunas fought in the King of the Cage Baltic Tour 4 and defeated Eigintas Šlekys of Kaunas in under one minute. He currently represents the mixed martial arts team at SMAUGLYS Martial Arts School in Vilnius.

Vaitkunas was set to fight Kevin Pease in August 2022, during the preliminaries of LFA 138 in the welterweight division but the fight was canceled due to Pease receiving an injury during a sparring session before the fight. In December 2022, Vaitkunas defeated Samejay Hurn in the event Gladiator Challenge: Seasons Beatings in Valley Center, California. 

Vaitkunas made his lightweight debut on March 4, 2023 at the event Gladiator Challenge: Proving Ground. He defeated Nate Jackson by Technical Submission (guillotine choke).

Mixed martial arts record 

|-
|Win
|align=center|3–0
| Nate Jackson
| Technical Submission (Guillotine Choke)
| Gladiator Challenge: Proving Ground
|
|align=center|1
|align=center|0:19
|Valley Center, California
|
|
|-
|Win
|align=center|2–0
| Samejay Hurn
| Technical Submission (Rear-Naked Choke)
| Gladiator Challenge: Seasons Beatings
|
|align=center|1
|align=center|1:50
|Valley Center, California
|
|-
|Win
|align=center|1–0
| Eigintas Sleyks
| Technical Submission (Rear-Naked Choke)
| King of the Cage Lithuania - Baltic Tour 4
|
|align=center|1
|align=center|0:59
|Kaunas, Lithuania
|

Submission grappling record (incomplete)

Awards and honors 
2016

  European Grappling Championship (+84kg)
  European Grappling Championship (Absolute)

References 

Welterweight mixed martial artists
Lithuanian male mixed martial artists
Mixed martial artists from California
1997 births
Living people